Mortroux is a village of Wallonia and a district of the municipality of Dalhem, located in the province of Liège, Belgium. 

Prior to 1977 Mortroux was a municipality of its own.

Former municipalities of Liège Province
Dalhem